Permutation is the third studio album by Brazilian electronic music producer Amon Tobin. It was released on 1 June 1998 by Ninja Tune.

Composition
The songs "Like Regular Chickens" and "People Like Frank" sample dialogue from, respectively, the David Lynch films Eraserhead (1977) and Blue Velvet (1986); the latter song also samples portions of Angelo Badalamenti's score for Blue Velvet.

Release
Permutation was released by the Ninja Tune label on 1 June 1998. Kevin Foakes, credited under the alias Openmind, contributed photography to and designed the album's packaging. "Like Regular Chickens" was issued as a single on 11 May 1998.

The immediate period following the release of Permutation saw Tobin's profile continue to rise, and he played at venues such as the Coachella Valley Music and Arts Festival, the Knitting Factory and the Montreal International Jazz Festival.

Track listing

References

External links
 Permutation at official Ninja Tune website (includes audio clips)
 
 

1998 albums
Amon Tobin albums
Ninja Tune albums